For the state pageant affiliated with Miss Teen USA, see Miss Iowa Teen USA

The Miss Iowa's Teen competition is the pageant that selects the representative of the U.S. state of Iowa in the Miss America's Teen pageant.

Emily Lerch of Fruitland was crowned Miss Iowa's Outstanding Teen on June 11, 2022, at the Adler Theater in Davenport, Iowa. She competed for the title of Miss America's Outstanding Teen 2023 at the Hyatt Regency Dallas in Dallas, Texas on August 12, 2022.

In January of 2023, the official name of the pageant was changed from Miss Iowa’s Outstanding Teen, to Miss Iowa’s Teen, in accordance with the national pageant.

Results summary 
The year in parentheses indicates year of Miss America's Outstanding Teen competition the award/placement was garnered.

Placements 

 Top 9: Lydia Fisher (2018)
 Top 15: Francesca Lubecki-Wilde (2012)

Awards

Non-finalist awards 
 Non-finalist Interview: Aly Olson (2011)
 Non-finalist Talent: Cali Wilson (2019)

Other awards 
 Academic Scholarship: Erica Lester (2007), Jessica Baker (2010)
 Outstanding Dance Talent Award: Cali Wilson (2019)
 Outstanding Instrumental Talent Award: Nina Yu (2016)
 Teens in Action Award Finalists: Savannah Necker (2013), Anna Masengarb (2014), Maggie Leach (2022)
 Top 5 Interview: Francesca Lubecki-Wilde (2012)

Winners

References

External links
 Official website

Iowa
Iowa culture
Women in Iowa
Annual events in Iowa